Dobków  is a village in the administrative district of Gmina Świerzawa, within Złotoryja County, Lower Silesian Voivodeship, in south-western Poland. Prior to 1945 it was in Germany.

Geography 

Dobkow is a linear settlement that stretches for about 3.5 km along the Bukownica River, a tributary of the Kaczawa River.

Geographically, the village is located at the northern base of the Wojcieszowski montainside, which form one of the limit of the Kaczawskie Mountains.

References

Ekomuseum of handicraft in Dobkow

Villages in Złotoryja County